

Squad information

Current squad

Out on loan

2015–16 Egyptian Premier League

Position

Results

Results by round

Result table

Match details

2016 Egypt Cup

Round 32

Round 16

Round 8

Al Masry SC seasons
Al Masry